Theodora "Teddi" Siddall (August 12, 1953– February 4, 2018) was an American actress and writer. She appeared in several roles in the television series Grey's Anatomy, Wings, LA Law, Hill Street Blues, and Happy Days, and the films Fade to Black, Prizzi's Honor, and Forever Strong. She also appeared in several television movies.

Early life
Siddall graduated from Woodward High School in Cincinnati, Ohio in 1971
Siddall graduated from the University of Cincinnati – College-Conservatory of Music in 1975.

Personal life
Siddall married actor Gary Cole in March 1992. They have one child, Mary, who is autistic. Siddall filed for divorce from Cole in June 2017.  Siddall died in 2018.

Partial filmography

Film 

 The Pleasure Palace (1980)
 Fade to Black (1980)
 Nichols and Dymes (1981)
 Tomorrow's Child (1982) (TV movie) 
 Prizzi's Honor (1985)
 Roe vs. Wade (1989) (TV movie)
 She Said No (1990) (TV movie)
 The Switch (1993)
 Indecent Seduction (1996)
 The Accident (1997) (TV movie)
 Lies He Told (1997) (TV movie)
 Forever Strong (2008)

Television 

 Happy Days (1974)
 Hill Street Blues (1981)
 Midnight Caller (1989–91)
 LA Law (1986)
 Wings (1996)
 Lies He Told (1997)
 Grey's Anatomy (2006)

References

External links
 
 Teddi Siddall - Turner Classic Movies

1953 births
2018 deaths
American film actresses
American television actresses
Actresses from Evanston, Illinois
People from Studio City, Los Angeles
20th-century American actresses
21st-century American actresses
University of Cincinnati – College-Conservatory of Music alumni